Trechus strongylus is a species of ground beetle in the subfamily Trechinae. It was described by René Jeannel in 1935.

References

strongylus
Beetles described in 1935